Bradley County Schools is a public school system based in Bradley County, Tennessee. All students living in the county attend these schools, except for those living in Cleveland; students in Cleveland attend schools in the Cleveland City Schools district.

High schools
 Bradley Central High School
 Walker Valley High School
 GOAL Academy - alternative high school
 REACH Adult High School - alternative high school

Middle schools 
Lake Forest Middle School
Ocoee Middle School

Elementary schools
 Black Fox Elementary School 
 Charleston Elementary School
 Hopewell Elementary School
 Michigan Avenue Elementary School
 North Lee Elementary School
 Oak Grove Elementary School
 Park View Elementary School
 Prospect Elementary School
 Taylor Elementary School
 Valley View Elementary School
 Waterville Community Elementary School

History
Schools have existed in Bradley County since its inception. Public schools have been in existence in Bradley County since at least 1871, and the name "Bradley County Schools" has been used for the district since at least the 1880s. The first reported superintendent was M.R. Burke, elected in 1885. The first public high schools in the county were Charleston High School in Charleston, opened in 1913, and Central High School in Cleveland, opened in 1916. Central High School was renamed Bradley County High School in 1920 and Bradley Central High School in 1948. Bradley Central was originally located at the current site of Ocoee Middle School, but was moved to its current location in 1972. Charleston High School was replaced with Walker Valley High School in 2001.

References 

 
Education in Bradley County, Tennessee
School districts in Tennessee